Arend Jantinus "Arie" van de Bunt (born 7 June 1969 in Amersfoort) is a former water polo goalkeeper from the Netherlands, who participated in three Summer Olympics for Holland. From 1992 on he finished in ninth (Barcelona), tenth (Atlanta) and eleventh (Sydney) position with the National Men's Team. He retired from the sport in the spring of 2005.

See also
 Netherlands men's Olympic water polo team records and statistics
 List of men's Olympic water polo tournament goalkeepers

External links
 

1969 births
Living people
Sportspeople from Amersfoort
Dutch male water polo players
Water polo goalkeepers
Olympic water polo players of the Netherlands
Water polo players at the 1992 Summer Olympics
Water polo players at the 1996 Summer Olympics
Water polo players at the 2000 Summer Olympics
20th-century Dutch people
21st-century Dutch people